Minnesota Department of Agriculture (MDA) is a government agency in Minnesota responsible for managing the state's food supply, natural resources, and agricultural economy.

History
The department began as the Minnesota State Dairy Commission in 1885 to eliminate the sale of adulterated milk and block the sale of oleomargarine as a substitute for butter. It was staffed by a department head, a single assistant and one clerk who doubled as the food chemist. In 1885, the budget was $6,000 per year.

Commissioners
Chris Heen (1920–1925). 
Byron G. Allen (1955–1961)
Jon Wefald (1971-1978)
William Walker (1978-1979)
Mark W. Seetin (1979-1983)
James W. Nichols (1983-1991)
Elton Redalen (1991–1995)
Gene Hugoson (1995–2011)
David Frederickson (2011–2019)
Thom Petersen (2019–present)

References

Agriculture in Minnesota
State agencies of Minnesota
1885 establishments in Minnesota
State departments of agriculture of the United States